An unofficial status referendum was held in the Falkland Islands on 2 April 1986. The result was 96% in favour of continued British sovereignty, with 88% of registered voters taking part.

Background
The referendum was carried out via a questionnaire sent out by the Falkland Islands Association and the Marplan Institute to all registered voters on the islands. The results of the "Falkland Island Sovereignty Survey" were released by Marplan on 2 April.

Results

References

Falkland Islands
1986
1986 in the Falkland Islands
Falkland Islands
April 1986 events in South America